Anke Sonnenbrodt is a German freestyle swimmer who won two silver medals at the 1983 European Aquatics Championships. The same year she set a European record in the 800 m freestyle. She missed the 1984 Summer Olympics in Los Angeles that were boycotted by East Germany, and instead competed at the Friendship Games, where she won a bronze medal in the 400 m freestyle.

References

Living people
German female swimmers
East German female freestyle swimmers
European Aquatics Championships medalists in swimming
Year of birth missing (living people)